Mark Albert is a fictional character played by James LeGros who appeared in the third and fourth seasons of the Fox Television show Ally McBeal.  In his introductory episode, Ally viewed Mark as a threat to her own position at Cage & Fish and as an undesirable replacement for her recently deceased friend long-term lover Billy. Because of this, she treated Mark with open hostility, although this conflict was quickly resolved.

Introduced as a new associate for the law firm of Cage & Fish, Mark was initially portrayed as both highly skilled in criminal law, nicknamed "the Closer" for his unparalleled skill with closing arguments and highly eccentric character such as obsessed with dental hygiene. Mark's was depicted in season four as a romantic straight man. He was first interested in Cindy McCauliff (Lisa Edelstein), a closeted transsexual. Richard and Ling both knew about Cindy's really sexual orientation, but were forbidden to reveal her secret to Mark, since they had learned about it in a privileged conversation. Mark quickly breaks ups with Cindy and later dates Elaine, the firm's receptionist. Elaine's unabashed lust for other men, particularly Jackson Duper (Taye Diggs) was a stumbling block for this relationship, as well as her eccentric godets, finally ended after Elaine had a one-night stand with a former lover.

After the romantic storylines with both Cindy and Elaine were resolved, Mark's character was quickly and quietly phased out at the end of season four. The character's absence was never explained—a recurring characteristic of shows run by David E. Kelley, see also articles on Ally McBeal, Boston Public, and The Practice.

References
 Kelly, David E., Ally McBeal
 Smith, Greg M., Beautiful TV
 Watson, Elwood, Searching the Soul of Ally McBeal

Ally McBeal characters
Fictional lawyers
Television characters introduced in 1997